The Wavelength 30 is an American sailboat that was designed by Paul Lindenberg as a racer-cruiser and first built in 1980.

The Wavelength 30 is a development of the very similar Lindenberg 30, the prototype for which was a boat named Wavelength.

Production
The design was built by W. D. Schock Corp in the United States from 1980 until 1981, with ten boats built, but it is now out of production.

Design
The Wavelength 30 is a racing keelboat, built predominantly of fiberglass, with wood trim. It has a masthead sloop rig, a nearly plumb stem, a reverse transom, an internally mounted spade-type rudder controlled by a tiller and a fixed fin keel. It displaces  and carries  of ballast.

See also
List of sailing boat types

Related development
Lindenberg 30

References

External links

Photo of a Wavelength 30

Keelboats
1980s sailboat type designs
Sailing yachts
Sailboat type designs by Paul Lindenberg
Sailboat types built by W. D. Schock Corp